IEI may mean:
Inborn errors of immunity, genetic mutations that cause an increased susceptibility to disease
Idiopathic environmental intolerance, also known as multiple chemical sensitivity
Institute for Emerging Issues
Institution of Engineers (India)
Institut d'échanges interculturels
Institution of Engineers of Ireland
Intensive English Institute, at the University of Illinois Urbana-Champaign
Intuitive Ethical Introvert, in socionics theory